Sports Interactive Limited is a British video game developer based in London, best known for the Football Manager series. Founded by brothers Oliver and Paul Collyer in July 1994, the studio was acquired by Japanese video game publisher Sega in 2006; Sports Interactive is now a part of Sega Europe, which also comprises Creative Assembly, Relic Entertainment and Amplitude Studios. In addition to its work on Football Manager, the studio has also created a number of other sports-management simulations, including NHL Eastside Hockey Manager and Championship Manager Quiz, and is the former developer of Championship Manager.

History
Founded by Paul Collyer and Oliver Collyer, the company is commonly abbreviated to "SI" amongst fans of their games.

In 2003, Sports Interactive split with former publisher Eidos Interactive and signed a deal with Sega to continue their flagship sports franchise under the new name, Football Manager. After the split, both parties kept their intellectual property. Sports Interactive kept the base code, the game database and programming of the game, whilst Eidos kept the rights to the Championship Manager franchise.

On 28 June 2012, Miles Jacobson and Ian Livingstone revealed why they split from Eidos Interactive and joined Sega. In a chat with GameHorizon, Jacobson thought that Beautiful Game Studios was brought in to take over Championship Manager, whilst Livingstone thought that Eidos Interactive brought Beautiful Game Studios to protect the firm in case Sports Interactive jumped ship. Jacobson commented, saying, “I’m sure there are two sides to this story, at the time we felt there was a lack of respect that we did for our work from Eidos. There seemed to be an attitude at the time in the industry that anyone could make games.” He continued by saying, “Eidos wanted more control. We wanted more control. We were asking for high royalties. Eidos set up Beautiful Game Studios nine months before Championship Manager 4 was due to come out. They told me that BGS were making a platform game. I thought our number was up.”

He then further elaborated by saying, “I went for a curry with the CEO of Sega in Japan and Europe, and he made me an offer on a napkin, I kept telling them we were not for sale. I told them they would have to double the offer for me to even discuss it with Paul and Oliver Collyer.”

On 4 April 2006, it was announced that Sega Holdings Europe Ltd, holding company for Sports Interactive's publisher's Sega, had acquired Sports Interactive. When Sega acquired the company, it had 34 employees.

Games
Championship Manager
Championship Manager
Championship Manager '93
Championship Manager 2
Championship Manager 96/97
Championship Manager 97/98
Championship Manager 3
Championship Manager: Season 99/00
Championship Manager: Season 00/01
Championship Manager: Season 01/02
Championship Manager 4
Championship Manager: Season 03/04
Football Manager
Football Manager 2005 (4 November 2004 for PC/Mac)
Football Manager 2006 (21 October 2005 for PC/Mac & April for PSP/Xbox 360)
Football Manager 2007 (20 October 2006 for PC/Mac & PSP)
Football Manager 2008 (October 2007 for PC/Mac & PSP and March 2008 for Xbox 360)
Football Manager 2009 (14 November 2008 for PC/Mac & PSP)
Football Manager Live (23 January 2009)
Football Manager 2010 (30 October 2009 for PC/Mac & PSP and April for iPhone)
Football Manager 2011 (5 November 2010 for PC/Mac, December for PSP & iPhone and April for iPad)
Football Manager 2012 (21 October 2011 for PC/Mac, PSP, December for iPhone & iPad and April for Android)
Football Manager 2013 (2 November 2012 for PC/Mac/PSP, iOS, Android)
Football Manager 2014 (31 October 2013 for PC/Mac/Linux/iOS/Android/Vita)
Football Manager 2015 (7 November 2014 for PC/Mac/Linux/iOS/Android)
Football Manager 2016 (13 November 2015 for PC/Mac/Linux)
Football Manager 2017 (4 November 2016 for PC/Mac/Linux)
Football Manager 2018 (10 November 2017 for PC/Mac/Linux)
Football Manager 2019 (2 November 2018 for PC/Mac/Switch)
Football Manager 2020 (18 November 2019 for PC/Mac/Switch/Android/iOS/Stadia)
Football Manager 2021 (24 November 2020 for PC/macOS/iOS/Android/Xbox One/Xbox Series X/S/Nintendo Switch)
Football Manager 2022 (8 November 2021 for PC/macOS/iOS/Android/Xbox One/Xbox Series X/S/Nintendo Switch)
Football Manager 2023 (8 November 2022 for PC/macOS/iOS/Apple Arcade/Android/Xbox One/Xbox Series X/S/Nintendo Switch)
Eastside Hockey Manager
NHL Eastside Hockey Manager (2 July 2004)
NHL Eastside Hockey Manager 2005 (27 May 2005)
NHL Eastside Hockey Manager 2005 (North American version) (27 September 2005)
NHL Eastside Hockey Manager 2007 (22 September 2006)
NHL Eastside Hockey Manager 2015 (26 March 2015)
Out of the Park Baseball Manager
Out of the Park Baseball Manager 2006 (31 May 2006)
Out of the Park Baseball Manager 2007 (23 March 2007)

Accolades 
The Collyers were appointed Member of the Order of the British Empire (MBE) in the 2010 New Year Honours for services to the video game industry. Miles Jacobson received the same appointment the following year.

References

External links

Official Football Manager website

Sega divisions and subsidiaries
Video game development companies
Video game companies of the United Kingdom
Video game companies established in 1994
British companies established in 1994
British subsidiaries of foreign companies
1994 establishments in England
Companies based in London
2006 mergers and acquisitions